Over the Moon is the title of a live album by singer-songwriter Judie Tzuke, released in 1997.

Track listing

Personnel
 Judie Tzuke – vocals
 Richard Cardwell – keyboards, backing vocals
 John Robert Wood – bass, backing vocals
 David Goodes – guitars
 Darrin Mooney – drums on tracks 1, 2, 6, 7, 9, 10, 12
 Pete May – drums on tracks 4, 5, 11
 Lucie Silverman, Annie Muggleton – backing vocals

Production
Paul Muggleton, Mike Paxman - producers
Matt Budd - mixing
Oskar Pall – mastering

References
Official website

Judie Tzuke albums
1997 live albums
Albums produced by Mike Paxman